The 2006 Kingfisher Airlines Tennis Open was an ATP tournament held at Cricket Club of India in Mumbai, India and played on outdoor hard courts. The tournament was part of the ATP International Series of the 2006 ATP Tour and was held from September 25 to October 2.

Dmitry Tursunov won his only title of the year, and the 1st of his career.

Finals

Singles

 Dmitry Tursunov defeated  Tomáš Berdych 6–3, 4–6, 7–6(7–5)

Doubles

 Mario Ančić /  Mahesh Bhupathi defeated  Rohan Bopanna /  Mustafa Ghouse 6–4, 6–7(6–8), [10–8]

References

External links
 ITF – Mumbai Tournament Details

 
Kingfisher Airlines Tennis Open
Kingfisher Airlines Tennis Open